Harvey Gene Phillips, Sr. (December 2, 1929 – October 20, 2010) was an American tuba player. He served as the Distinguished Professor of the Jacobs School of Music at Indiana University, Bloomington (from 1971 to 1994) and was dedicated advocate for the tuba becoming popularly known as Mr. Tuba.

Biography
Born in Aurora, Missouri, Phillips was a professional freelance musician in New York City from 1950 to 1971, winning his first professional position with the Ringling Bros. and Barnum & Bailey Circus Band as a teenager. In 1960, he co-founded The All-Star Concert Band with American cornet soloist James F. Burke (Musician). The band recorded three albums and was composed of virtually every top soloist and first chair player in the country. He served as personnel manager for Symphony of the Air, Leopold Stokowski, Igor Stravinsky, and Gunther Schuller. He was a key figure in the formation of the International Tuba Euphonium Association (formerly T.U.B.A.) and the founder and president of the Harvey Phillips Foundation, Inc. which administers Octubafest, Tubachristmas, Tubasantas, Tubacompany, and Tubajazz.

Along with William Bell, August Helleberg, Gene Pokorny, and Arnold Jacobs, Phillips is considered legendary among tubists. In 2007, Phillips was inducted into the American Classical Music Hall of Fame, the only wind instrument player to receive this prestigious honor. Other inductees that year included Yo-Yo Ma, Donald Martino and the Cleveland Orchestra.

He died of Parkinson's in Bloomington, aged 80.

Awards
 Principal Tuba, Circus Hall of Fame Band
 Honorary Doctor of Music New England Conservatory (1971)
 Harvey Phillips Day has been celebrated by the New England conservatory (1971) and by his home town Bi-Centennial Celebration, Marionville, Missouri (1976)
 Kappa Kappa Psi Distinguished Service to Music Medal (1979)
 Governor of Missouri declared a Harvey Phillips Weekend (1985)
 Honorary Doctor of Humanities University of Missouri (1987)
 Association of Concert Bands "first" Mentor Ideal Award (1994)
 Sousa Foundation Sudler Medal of the Order of Merit award (1995)
 National Band Association Academy of Wind and Percussion Arts Award (1995)
 United Musical Instruments Lifetime Achievement Award (1996)
 American Bandmasters Association Edwin Franco Goldman Award (1996)
 Rafael Mendez Brass Institute Lifetime Achievement Award (1997)
 Colonial Euphonium-Tuba Institute Development of Musical Artistry & Opportunities Award (1997)
 Phi Mu Alpha Orpheus Award (1997)
 Inducted into the Classical Music Hall of Fame (2007)
 Indiana University President's Award for Excellence (2008)
 Inducted into the Windjammers Unlimited, Inc. Hall of Fame (2010)

Discography

With Kenny Burrell
 Blues - The Common Ground (Verve, 1968)
With Gil Evans Orchestra
 New Bottle Old Wine (World Pacific, 1958)
 Into the Hot (Impulse!, 1961)
With Curtis Fuller
 Cabin in the Sky (Impulse!, 1962)
With Dizzy Gillespie
 Perceptions (Verve, 1961)
With John Lewis
 Odds Against Tomorrow (Soundtrack) (United Artists, 1959)
 The Golden Striker (Atlantic, 1960)
With Wes Montgomery
 Movin' Wes (Verve, 1962)
With Gus Vali & His Orchestra
 A Greek in Dixieland (United Artists, 1958)
Matteson-Phillips Tubajazz Consort

References

External links
 Jacobs School of Music
 Jacobs School Blog
 www.indiana.edu
 Harvey Phillips interview by Bruce Duffie, April 24, 1995

American classical tubists
2010 deaths
Jacobs School of Music faculty
1929 births
Distinguished Service to Music Medal recipients
People from Aurora, Missouri
Matteson-Phillips Tubajazz Consort members
20th-century classical musicians